The white-faced saki (Pithecia pithecia), called the Guianan saki and the golden-faced saki, is a species of the New World saki monkey. They can be found in Brazil, French Guiana, Guyana, Suriname and Venezuela. This species lives in the understory and lower canopy of the forest, feeding mostly on fruits, nuts, seeds, and insects. Although they are arboreal creatures and are specialists of swinging from tree to tree (brachiation), they are also terrestrial when foraging. White-faced sakis typically live around 14 years in their natural habitat and have been recorded to live up to 36 years in captivity. Sakis are active in the day and sleep highly elevated (15-20m) in trees with many leaves to shelter them from weather and flying predators.

A formerly recognized subspecies of this monkey, P. p. chrysocephala, was elevated to full species status as P. chrysocephala in 2014.

Reproduction and Sexual Dimorphism
 In captivity, female white-faced sakis experience ovarian cycles of approximately 17 days, and a gestational period of 20–21 weeks. Following birth, the mother undergoes a period of lactationally-induced infertility lasting 23 weeks, on average. White faced sakis breed once a year (in the spring) and only have one offspring.

White-faced sakis display noticeable sexual dimorphism in their coloration and also in size. Females have shorter hair than males, with brownish-grey fur and white or pale brown stripes around the corners of the nose and mouth. Males, on the other hand, have blacker fur, with a reddish-white forehead, face, and throat. Their faces are much whiter than females and males are larger in body size. Males are approximately 500 grams heavier than females. Young saki males are often identified as females because of their sometimes "grizzling" dorsal hair and orangish bellies and it is approximately 2 months of age when males and females being to show differences, although it gradually becomes obvious over a few years.

Behavior 
A pair often mates for life, and they are very devoted to one another. They will strengthen their bond by grooming one another. Male saki monkeys are usually more active than females.
They are considered monogamous, but have seldom been observed over a long period of time and many primatologists question their behavior as being "typical monogamy" because of their inconsistent group numbers and possible seasonal effect on congregations. A South American study performed by Shawn M. Lehman shows that their group number can range from 2-12 group members, with higher numbers typically occurring (but not exclusively) in Guyana, South America. But most widespread observations conclude that they travel in small groups of 2 and 3 which usually include the bonded parents and the offspring; they travel approximately 0.5 to 1.25 miles in search of food or other resources during the early morning and day, when they are most active.

Locomotion 
White faced sakis vary from many other primates including their close relative, Chiropotes satanas, in that they are predominantly leapers, which is how they travel approximately 70 percent of the time. The other 30 percent is spent quadrupedal walking and running (25 percent) and climbing (less than 5 percent).

Diet 
These primates travel longer distances than many other primates and can be picky about their sources of food; they prefer trees that produce high amounts of fruit, Capparis trees, and trees with water holes. Sakis have a mixed diet of seeds, fruits, leaves, honey, flowers, insects, and small mammals and birds and typically ingest seeds and plants that are high in lipid composition. They have also been observed crawling into hollow portions of trees and eating bats where they roost. They are capable of doing so due to their large canine teeth which assist in cracking the hard outer covering of shells and nuts.

Predation 
If a predator is near, alarm calls, which have been observed to last from 1.2 to 88 minutes, will be sounded by an initial saki and then continually echoed by others to spread the warning. They will then puff their bodies up and stomp their feet on the ground or trees in an attempt to intimidate the threat. They are small primates and dwell in the branches of trees, so one of their biggest predator threats are large birds such as hawks, vultures, and the harpy eagle. In the face of danger, white faced sakis will emit warning calls to others or freeze if in the canopy in an attempt to move down where they are out of sight. The predator response of the sakis are due to what type of threat they are facing: if a smaller, easily overpowered threat, the group will participate in a behavior called "mobbing" to scare the predator away, but if the threat is larger, such as an eagle, they will refrain from warning calls and descend out of sight into the lower canopy. Other terrestrial and aquatic predators include the tayra, jaguars, pumas, green anacondas, ocelots, red-tailed boa, and even large mustelids, which are usually threats to the young and elderly.

References

External links 

Pithecia pithecia, MSW3

white-faced saki
Primates of South America
Mammals of Brazil
Mammals of French Guiana
Mammals of Guyana
Mammals of Suriname
Mammals of Venezuela
Fauna of the Guianas
white-faced saki
white-faced saki